The Orinoco goose (Neochen jubata) is a Near Threatened species of waterfowl in tribe Tadornini of subfamily Anserinae. It is found in every mainland South American country except Chile, French Guiana, Suriname, and Uruguay.

Taxonomy and systematics

The Orinoco goose's taxonomy is unsettled. The International Ornithological Committee (IOC) and BirdLife International's Handbook of the Birds of the World (HBW) place it alone in genus Neochen. However, based on a molecular phylogenetic study published in 2014, the South American Classification Committee of the American Ornithological Society and the Clements taxonomy place it and the Andean goose in the resurrected genus Oressochen. The IOC and HBW place the Andean goose in genus Chloephaga.

Two fossil relatives have been described from Pleistocene sites in South America, Neochen pugil and N. debilis.

The Orinoco goose is monotypic.

Description

Adult males have an off-white head, neck, and breast with slight buffy streaks on the nape and buffy scalloping on the breast. Their mantle is gray with white scalloping. They have an orange band across the upper mantle and onto the sides of the breast and flanks and a crescent of dark brown behind the flanks. Their undertail coverts are white. Their wings are black with a wide white speculum. Their bill has a black maxilla and a mostly red mandible and their legs and feet are bright salmon red. Adult females have a similar pattern as the male, but have a drab wash on their crown and nape, less orange on the flanks, and darker scalloping on the sides of the belly. Their legs and feet are more a dull orange than bright red.

Distribution and habitat

The Orinoco goose is found from Venezuela south through Colombia, eastern Ecuador, eastern Peru, and Bolivia into far northern Argentina and in a broad swath across central Brazil. An isolated population spans the northern Brazil-Guyana border. Though the IUCN range map includes French Guiana, Suriname, and Paraguay, the South American Classification Committee of the American Ornithological Society has no records in the first two countries and records only as a vagrant in Paraguay.

The Orinoco goose inhabits wet savanna and the edges of large freshwater wetlands in the wet season, and in the dry season is also found on river beaches and oxbow lakes in the Amazon Basin.

Behavior

Migration

The Orinoco goose is a year-round resident of the Llanos of Venezuela and possibly Colombia. Some of the Bolivian population is also non-migratory. The migration pattern of other populations, or lack of it, are not known.

The migration of Orinoco geese may spread disease. Toxoplasma gondii and Neospora caninum are both apicomplexan parasites that infect various animals and cause severe disease. They thrive in fields where Orinoco geese forage during stopovers during migration. Once birds are infected, they can transmit the parasites to other birds or humans. Orinoco goose meat is eaten by people in Bolivia and Brazil, potentially leading to human infection.

Feeding

The Orinoco goose is herbivorous and feeds mainly on leaves and seed heads, especially those of grasses. It also feeds on aquatic algae in stagnant water along rivers and oxbows. It mostly forages during the day in open areas near water, although it also forages at night. Individuals move between feeding and resting areas at dawn and dusk.

Breeding

The Ornico goose's breeding season varies geographically and with rainfall patterns. Populations below the Equator nest between April and November, a mostly dry season. In Venezuela most nest in the July to August wet season though some nest at other times. Orinoco geese nest in both natural and artificial cavities. They use cavities in trees formed by natural causes such as limb loss or rot rather than those created by other cavity nesting species, and may compete with owls and parrots for cavities. There are some reports of nesting on the ground in dense grass but that strategy appears rare. 

Orinoco geese are sometimes brood parasites, with a female laying eggs in another Orinoco goose's nest. In one study unparasitized nests had a clutch size averaging seven eggs and parasitized ones averaged about 19. Nest success as a percentage of the clutch was higher in parasitized nests.

Orinoco geese form strong year-round pair bonds and are intensely territorial during the breeding season. Males guard females during the incubation period.

Vocalization

The Orinoco goose is very vocal. During the breeding season males make "a high whistle and guttural honks" and females "a loud cackle". Males also make "a shrill-whistled zree and series of hollow reedy whistles" and females "a low guttural honking gu'rump, gur'rump, gur'rump". Both sexes make "a distinctive nasal honking, unnhh?". Young make "soft chicken-like peeps".

Status

The IUCN has assessed the Orinoco goose as Near Threatened. It has a large range but its estimated population of 10,000 to 25,000 mature individuals is decreasing "at a slow to moderate rate". The major cause of the decline appears to be hunting, because populations on unhunted protected areas are stable. Ongoing conversion of habitat to rice cultivation is another threat. Conservation efforts should focus on river margins, sandy beaches along main river channels, and migration routes.

References

External links

Orinoco goose
Orinoco goose
Birds of Venezuela
Birds of the Guianas
Birds of the Amazon Basin
Orinoco goose
Birds of Brazil